Sartilly-Baie-Bocage is a commune in the department of Manche, northwestern France. The municipality was established on 1 January 2016 by merger of the former communes of Angey, Champcey, Montviron, La Rochelle-Normande and Sartilly (the seat).

See also 
Communes of the Manche department

References  

Communes of Manche
Populated places established in 2016
2016 establishments in France